Avaday (Äwäźäy) is a rural locality (a village) in Kubiyazovsky Selsoviet of Askinsky District, Bashkortostan, Russia. The population was 13 . There are 2 streets.

Geography 
Avaday is located 20 km northeast of Askino (the district's administrative centre) by road. Novaya Burma is the nearest rural locality.

Ethnicity 
The village is inhabited by Bashkirs.

References 

Rural localities in Askinsky District